Dios le Guarde is a village and municipality in the province of Salamanca,  western Spain, part of the autonomous community of Castile-Leon.

Name 

The name came from Old Spanish meaning "God's Guard".

Geography

References

Municipalities in the Province of Salamanca